Auerbach is a town in Upper Austria, Austria. Its length from north to south is 4.3 km and from east to west is 5 km; its area is 10.78 km2. In 2015, it had 565 inhabitants.

Subdivisions
Auerbach consists of two Katastralgemeinden: Auerbach and Irnprechting. It contains the following settlements:

 Auerbach
 Holz
 Höring
 Oberirnprechting
 Oberkling
 Riensberg
 Rietzing
 Unterirnprechting
 Unterkling
 Wimpassing

History
Auerbach was part of the Duchy of Bavaria until 1779, when it passed to Austria with the rest of the Innviertel as a result of the Treaty of Teschen, that ended the War of the Bavarian Succession. During the Napoleonic Wars, it became Bavarian again until 1814, when it rejoined Upper Austria.

Population

References

Cities and towns in Braunau am Inn District